The Two Little Rascals (Spanish: Los dos golfillos) is a 1961 Spanish drama film directed by Antonio del Amo and starring Joselito, Maria Piazzai and Luz Márquez.

The film's sets were designed by Sigfrido Burmann.

Cast

References

Bibliography 
 de España, Rafael. Directory of Spanish and Portuguese film-makers and films. Greenwood Press, 1994.

External links 
 

1961 drama films
Spanish drama films
1961 films
1960s Spanish-language films
Films directed by Antonio del Amo
1960s Spanish films